Santa Cecilia Orchestra may refer to:

 the Orquesta Clásica Santa Cecilia of Madrid, Spain
 the Orchestra dell'Accademia Nazionale di Santa Cecilia of Rome, Italy
 the Santa Cecilia Orchestra (Los Angeles) of Los Angeles, California, United States